Abarenicola affinis is a species of polychaetes belonging to the family Arenicolidae.

The species is found in South Hemisphere (southern areas). They typically live in soft sediments and are filter-feeders.

References

Annelids
Animals described in 1903
Fauna of the Pacific Ocean